Red 5 may refer to:
 Red 5, a Rebel call sign in the classic era of the Star Wars universe
 Red5 (media server)
 Red 5, a pseudonym of German DJ and musician Thomas Kukula
 Red 5, Nigel Mansell's nickname whilst he drove for Williams and Newman/Haas Racing
 Red 5, a suit tile in Japanese Mahjong
 Red 5 Comics, an indie comic publisher, mainly famous for Atomic Robo
 Red 5 Studios, a studio formed by three key former members of the World of Warcraft team
 Red Five, a Russian spy ring broken up post-World War II, discussed in Foyle's War Series Seven, episode 3 ("Sunflower")
 Red Five (band), an American rock band